The Aztec Eagle Warriors are a semi-professional ice hockey team in Mexico City, Mexico. They play in the Liga Mexicana Élite.

History
The club was founded in 2010, and joined the Liga Mexicana Elite the same season. They finished in second place in the regular season, but lost in the semifinals to the Teotihuacan Priests 2 games to none.

Season-by-Season Results

Roster
GK: Alfonso De Alba
GK: Paulo Rivera
D: Alejandro Rosette (C)
D: Miguel Colás
D: Miguel Rivacoba
D: Ángel Sánchez
D: Alejandro Escalante
D: Herman Rash
F: Alfredo Ibarra
F: Roberto Chabat (A)
F: Diego Linares
F: Rodrigo Olagaray
F: César Durán
F: Rodrigo Cepeda
F: Carlos Vargas
F: Oscar Rubio (A)
F: Andrés Valenzuela
F: Eduardo Flegman
F: Hernando Chávez

External links
Team profile on hockeymexico.com
Ice hockey teams in Mexico
Sports teams in Mexico City